Roberto Mancinelli may refer to:

Roberto Mancinelli (A&R)
Roberto Mancinelli (footballer)